Rana Iradat Sharif Khan is a Pakistani politician who has been a member of the National Assembly of Pakistan since August 2018.

Political career
He was elected to the National Assembly of Pakistan from Constituency NA-146 (Pakpattan-II) as a candidate of Pakistan Muslim League (N) in 2018 Pakistani general election.

References

External links
National Assembly of Pakistan

Living people
Pakistani MNAs 2018–2023
Pakistan Muslim League (N) politicians
Year of birth missing (living people)